Francis Cottam (6 June 1900 – 19 May 1987) was an English cricketer. He was a right-handed batsman and a left-arm slow bowler. He was born and died in Redhill, Surrey.

Cottam made just one first-class appearance, for Essex, during the 1922 season, against Dublin University. He did not bat during the match, but bowled for ten overs without taking a wicket.

References

External links
Francis Cottam at Cricket Archive 

1900 births
1987 deaths
English cricketers
Essex cricketers
People from Redhill, Surrey